The Social Convergence (CS) is a left-wing political party in Chile. It is led by Gabriel Boric.

It was founded in 2018 by the Autonomist Movement (MA), Libertarian Left (IL) (a part of the movement left the party in 2019), Socialism and Freedom (SOL) and New Democracy (ND). It is part of the leftist coalition Broad Front. In mid-2019, members of the movement began their process to register as a legally constituted political party. 

Social Convergence experienced an internal crisis in 2019, after a large number of militants resigned from the party, due to the initial rejection of Gabriel Boric's participation in the agreement made by the congress to create a new constitution, initiated due to the 2019 Chilean protests. Arguing that the agreement did not seem to them to be a sufficient response to the protests. However, after the changes that the agreement underwent (gender parity, indigenous seats, etc), these members ended up supporting the agreement, but did not remain part of the party.

Authorities

President of the Republic

Deputies

Election results

Presidential elections

Congress election

See also 
:Category:Social Convergence politicians

References

External links
Official site

2018 establishments in Chile
Autonomism
Left-wing politics in Chile
Libertarian socialist parties
Political parties established in 2018
Political parties in Chile
Progressive International
Progressive parties
Socialist parties in Chile